Alfred Russell Marcy (July 21, 1900May 19, 1977) was a United States Army colonel who was the Chief of the Radio Division and Deputy Signal Officer of the Central Pacific command during World War II. During the Korean War, he was specifically selected to become signal officer by General Edward Almond of the U.S. Army X Corps for the Inchon landings and operations in North Korea.

Early life
Alfred Russell Marcy, son of Albert Theodore Marcy and Julia Edna (Park) Marcy was born in Oneida, New York, July 21, 1900. His father worked as an industrial blacksmith and foreman for a steel company; his mother liked to write poetry and doted on crossword puzzles.

Following graduation from high school, Marcy entered into the New York Guard. While in the New York Guard, he worked in radio for WFBL, where he eventually became Chief Radio Engineer. By 1928, Marcy had been promoted to 2nd lieutenant of infantry of the 108th in the New York Guard as well as the US Army Reserve. Less than two years later, he was promoted to 1st lieutenant of infantry in both.

World War II
On October 15, 1940, Marcy made the move from the New York Guard to the U.S. Army with the rank of major. At Fort Ord, California, while awaiting transfer overseas, he was promoted to lieutenant colonel. While in Hawaii, he commanded the 3rd Battalion of the 108th Infantry until he was shifted to the island of Kauai, where he served as executive officer of the 54th Infantry Brigade, 27th Division.  He also planned and supervised installation of radio navigation aids and point-to-point joint army-navy radio stations from Hawaii to New Zealand and throughout the Central Pacific.

Marcy was promoted to full colonel in September 1944. He then was engaged in communication planning for assaults against Japanese base stations in the Gilberts, Marshalls, Palaus, Marianas, Bonins and the Ryukyu Islands.
Colonel Alfred Russell Marcy served as the American Chief of the Radio Division and Deputy Signal Officer of the Central Pacific command during World War II.

Korean War
After the war, he became deputy chief of the Army Communications System with headquarters in Washington, D.C. From August to October 1947, he served in Turkey in support of the Truman Doctrine.

When the Korean War broke out he was on a training mission with V Corps in Fort Bragg, North Carolina.  He was then flown to Korea to become signal officer of the U.S. IX Corps during the Naktong River battles. He was then specifically selected by General Ned Almond to be signal officer of the U.S. X Corps for the Battle of Inchon landings and operations in North Korea.

Dates of rank

Awards and decorations
  Legion of Merit with one Oak Leaf Cluster
  Bronze Star
  Air Medal
  American Defense Service Medal
  American Campaign Medal
  Asiatic Pacific Campaign Medal
  World War II Victory Medal
  Korean Service Medal
  Armed Forces Reserve Medal
  National Defense Service Medal
  United Nations Service Medal
  Republic of Korea Presidential Unit Citation
Overseas Service Bars

References

Further reading

Employment of Retired Military and Civilian Personnel by Defense Industries. Washington, D.C.: GPO, 1959.
Wickersham, Virginia Voorheis. Interference in American Foreign Affairs by Unauthorized American Citizens. Leland Stanford Junior University, 1943.

1900 births
1977 deaths
United States Army colonels
United States Army personnel of World War II
United States Army personnel of the Korean War
Recipients of the Legion of Merit
Recipients of the Air Medal
People from Oneida, New York